It's a Beautiful Day is the debut album by San Francisco band It's a Beautiful Day.  This album's song "White Bird" was the band's biggest hit. The album rose to number 47 on Billboard's Top LPs American albums chart.

The cover
The cover, designed by George Hunter and painted by Kent Hollister, was based on the 1912 painting Woman on the Top of a Mountain by Charles Courtney Curran. The design used an old version of the Columbia Records logo that George Hunter felt fitted better with the feel of the rest of the cover. The album cover is number 24 on Rolling Stone'''s list of 100 greatest album covers. The Girl can also be seen in the background on the cover of Happy Trails by Quicksilver Messenger Service.

Album content
The group's signature song "White Bird" was inspired by the experiences David and Linda LaFlamme had while living in Seattle, Washington.  For a few weeks in December 1967 the group members lived in the attic of an old house while playing and rehearsing at a Seattle venue originally known as The Encore Ballroom.  The band's manager, Matthew Katz, had recently assumed control over the club and renamed it "San Francisco Sound". In an ironic twist on the band's name, the song was partly inspired by Seattle's rainy winter weather.  In a later interview David LaFlamme said:

<blockquote>
Where the 'white bird' thing came from ... We were like caged birds in that attic.  We had no money, no transportation, the weather was miserable. We were just barely getting by on a very small food allowance provided to us. It was quite an experience, but it was very creative in a way.
</blockquote>

A substantial part of the theme and arrangement of the song "Bombay Calling" was used by Deep Purple as the basis for their song "Child in Time".

Critical reception
Lindsay Planer at AllMusic, gave the album four stars out of five, writing:

In popular culture
The song "White Bird" is used in three episodes of the 1980s television series Knight Rider. It is the theme song for the relationship between main character Michael Knight and his one true love, and appears in the episodes "White Bird" in season 1, "Let It Be Me" in season 2 and "The Scent of Roses" in season 4. The song was also featured in the 2015 movie Focus with Will Smith. The album cover is used in Naoki Urasawa's 2018 one-shot manga "It's a Beautiful Day".

Track listing

Personnel

It's A Beautiful Day
 David LaFlamme – lead vocals, violin
 Linda LaFlamme – organ, piano, electric piano, celeste, harpsichord
 Hal Wagenet – guitar
 Mitchell Holman – bass
 Val Fuentes – drums
 Pattie Santos – vocals, tambourine, bells, block, gourd

Additional musician
 Bruce Steinberg – harmonica (track 2)

Production
 David LaFlamme – producer
 Brian Ross-Myring – engineer
 Col. John Walker, U.S.M.C. (Ret.) – manager
 Globe Propaganda – cover art
 Bruce Steinberg – photography

Chart performance

Album

References

External links
 
 

1969 debut albums
It's a Beautiful Day albums
CBS Records albums